Mary Elizabeth Harmsworth, Viscountess Northcliffe,  (née Milner; 22 December 1867-29 July 1963, later Lady Hudson), was the daughter of Robert Milner, of Kidlington, Oxfordshire, England.

Marriages
Mary Elizabeth Milner married, firstly, Alfred Charles William Harmsworth (born 16 July 1865, Chapelizod, County Dublin, Ireland – died 14 August 1922) on 11 April 1888, at which time her married name became Harmsworth, and she was styled as Baroness Northcliffe, effective 27 December 1905. In 1911, her portrait was painted by Philip de László, and in 1914, it appeared on the cover of Country Life magazine.
The westernmost tip of Franz Joseph Land in the Arctic was named in her honour by an expedition financed by her husband. She was later elevated to Viscountess Northcliffe on 14 January 1918. Lady Northcliffe was a British Red Cross volunteer during World War I. Her marriage was childless, which weighed heavily on her and her husband. 

Six months after her husband's death, she remarried, on 4 April 1923, to Sir Robert Arundell Hudson.

Death
Lady Hudson died in Virginia Water, Surrey, aged 95.

Awards and honors
 Dame Grand Cross of the Order of the British Empire (GBE) — 1918
 Registered as an Associate Royal Red Cross (ARRC) — 1919
 Dame of Grace of the Order of St. John of Jerusalem — 1919

Sources

1867 births
1963 deaths
British viscountesses
Dames of Grace of the Order of St John
Dames Grand Cross of the Order of the British Empire
Mary
People from Kidlington
Associate Members of the Royal Red Cross